Ravinder Randhawa (born 1952) is a British Asian novelist and short story writer. She founded the Asian Women Writers' Collective, an organisation for British Asian women writers.

Life
Randhawa was born in India in 1952, but moved to England with her parents when she was seven years old, and grew up in Warwickshire. She has worked with an organisation setting up refuges and resource centres for Asian women, and participated in antiracism campaigns. As of 2014, she was living in London.

Randhawa is the subject of a chapter in British Asian Fiction: Twenty-first Century Voices by Sarah Upstone. Upstone writes that Randhawa "was essential to the burgeoning British Asian literature" and "not only wrote prolifically about the lives of British Asian women, but also fostered the careers of others, including Meera Syal."

Work

In 1984, she founded the Asian Women Writers' Collective, which has published multiple collections of Asian women writers works. Her first novel A Wicked Old Woman is described as "a pioneering work of fiction", "one of the first [novels] to be published by a British Asian writer in the postwar period", and "a linguistically and structurally playful text that seems to foreground itself as artwork." The Coral Strand, published in 2001, was reissued as A Tiger's Smile. It "moves between pre-Independence Bombay and contemporary London" and "shifts seamlessly between places and states of mind, physical settings and stream of consciousness, between poetic prose and documentary realism".

Selected publications

A Wicked Old Woman. St. Paul: Women's Press (1987). 
Hari-Jan. London: Mantra Lingua (1992). 
The Coral Strand. Looe: House of Stratus (2001).

Contributed works

A Girl's Best Friend. St. Paul: Women's Press (1987) 
Right of Way. St. Paul: Women's Press (1989). 
Flaming Spirit. London: Virago Press (1994). 
The New Anthem. Delhi: Tranquebar Press (2009).

References

External links

1952 births
Living people
British Asian writers
British women writers